Alec Baldwin is an American actor, comedian, and writer known for his work in theater, film and television.

Baldwin received his Academy Award nomination for Best Supporting Actor for his performance in the drama The Cooler (2003). He received a Tony Award nomination for Best Actor in a Play for his performance as Stanley Kowalski in the Broadway revival of Tennessee Williams' A Streetcar Named Desire in 1992. He received 19 Primetime Emmy Award nominations, winning twice for his performance as Jack Donaghy in the Tina Fey created NBC sitcom 30 Rock (2008, 2009) and for his performance as Donald Trump on Saturday Night Live (2017). He has also received 11 Golden Globe Award nominations, winning for 30 Rock (2007, 2009, 2010), and 20 Screen Actors Guild Award nominations, winning eight times for 30 Rock. He received a British Academy Film Award nomination for his supporting performance in Nancy Meyers' romantic comedy It's Complicated (2009).

Having won eight Screen Actors Guild Awards, he is the most SAG-awarded male actor, and tied with Julianna Margulies as the most SAG-awarded actor overall. Additionally, with twenty total nominations, he and Margulies are tied for the record of third-most SAG nominations.

Major associations

Academy Awards

Tony Awards

Emmy Awards

Industry awards

BAFTA Award

Golden Globe Awards

Screen Actors Guild Awards

Theatre awards

Drama Desk Award

Obie Award

Theatre World Award

Critics awards

References 

Baldwin, Alec